Booth University College (Booth UC or BUC), incorporated as the Salvation Army William and Catherine Booth University College, is a private, Christian liberal arts university college located in downtown Winnipeg, Manitoba, Canada. It is affiliated with the Salvation Army, a Christian organization presently operating in more than 130 countries.

History
Booth University College was established in 1982 as Catherine Booth Bible College. It was renamed William and Catherine Booth College in 1997 in honour of The Salvation Army's co-founders, William Booth and Catherine Booth. On 17 June 2010, the college officially became Booth University College. Close to 300 students are enrolled at the Winnipeg Campus (September to April). Additional students are enrolled through Booth UC's School for Continuing Studies (which offers spring, summer, and online courses).

Facilities
Booth University College is located in downtown Winnipeg at 447 Webb Place and 290 Vaughan Street. In addition to classrooms, office space and a chapel, the main building on Webb Place contains a gymnasium, cafeteria and residential accommodation for more than 200 students.

The University College's John Fairbank Memorial Library is located at 290 Vaughan Street, which is a three-minute walk from the main campus at Webb Place. The library has over 55,000 books as well as a subscription to 115,000 ebooks. The library's holdings are augmented by those of the Centre for Salvation Army Studies, which is located at 447 Webb Place. The centre houses a rare and growing collection of Salvation Army books, pamphlets, reports and periodicals.

Petersen Hall, located at the Vaughan Street portion of the campus, is home to Booth's School for Continuing Studies and a growing business degree program. Opened in January 2015, Petersen Hall provides three classrooms meant to extend the reach of Booth University College far beyond its campus in Winnipeg.

Academic programs
Social Sciences
Psychology
Behavioural Sciences
Humanities
 General Studies
 English and Film
 Religion
Professional Studies
Social Work
 Business Administration
Majors in Accounting, Financial Crime, Management and Innovation, and Marketing and Communication available.
School for Continuing Studies
 Certificate in Applied Leadership
 Certificate in Chaplaincy and Spiritual Care
 Certificate in Not-for-Profit Management
 Certificate in Advanced Leadership for Congregations
 Certificate in Kroc Center Leadership

See also
 Higher education in Manitoba
 List of colleges and universities named after people

References

External links
 

Colleges in Manitoba
Universities and colleges in Winnipeg
Private universities and colleges in Canada
Schools in downtown Winnipeg
Christian schools in Manitoba